Arthès is a commune of the Tarn department in southern France. It lies on the river Tarn, 6 km northeast of Albi.

See also
Communes of the Tarn department

References

Communes of Tarn (department)